The Mondial de l'Automobile de Paris 2012, known in English as the 2012 Paris Motor Show, took place from 29 September to 14 October 2012 at Paris Expo.

Introductions

Production cars

 Audi A3 Sportback
 Audi RS5 Cabriolet
 BMW 1 Series 3DR
 BMW 3 Series Touring
 Chevrolet Trax
 Citroën C3 Picasso facelift
 Citroën DS3 convertible
 Fiat 500X
 Fisker Karma Surf
 Ford Mondeo MkV
 Ford Tourneo Connect
 Hyundai i30 3DR
 Hyundai ix35 Fuel Cell
 Jaguar F-Type
 Kia Carens
 Lexus LS facelift

 Maserati GranTurismo Convertible MC
 Mazda6 Wagon
 Mercedes-Benz A45 AMG
 Mercedes-Benz CLS63 AMG Shooting Brake
 Mercedes-Benz SLS AMG Electric Drive
 Mini Paceman
 Mitsubishi Outlander P-HEV
 Opel Adam
 Peugeot 301
 Porsche 911 (991) Carrera 4/4S
 Range Rover (L405)
 Volkswagen Golf VII, GTI, BlueMotion
 Volvo V40 Cross Country, RDesign
 Ferrari F12 Berlinetta
 Ferrari 458 Italia

Concept cars

 Audi Crosslane Coupé
 Audi SQ5 TDI concept
 Bentley Continental GT3 race car
 BMW Concept Active Tourer
 Lexus LF-CC

 McLaren P1 pre-production concept
 Nissan Terra
 Peugeot Onyx
 Porsche Panamera Sport Turismo
 smart forstars
 Suzuki S-Cross Concept

Motorsport cars

 Citroën DS3 WRC
 Honda Civic WTCC (European Debut)
Honda Ligier Martini JS 53 (Sport-Prototype)
 Hyundai i20 WRC (European Debut)

Ferrari teased the successor to the Enzo by showing just the bare-bones skeleton of the new car.  It will be a hybrid and will be revealed in 2013.

See also
 Paris Motor Show

References

External links

Official web site
Cars showing at 2012 Paris Motor Show

Auto shows in France
September 2012 events in France
October 2012 events in France
Motor Show
Paris Motor Show